Evaluna Mercedes Reglero Rodríguez de Echeverry (born August 7, 1997), known as Evaluna Montaner, is a Venezuelan actress, singer, music director, dancer, television presenter, daughter of singer Ricardo Montaner and younger sister of Mauricio and Ricardo Montaner, known as Mau y Ricky.

Biography
Evaluna was born in Caracas, Venezuela to Ricardo Montaner and Marlene Rodríguez. She was raised in Buenos Aires, Argentina. Since childhood she learned piano, harp and various types of dance. She attended The Cushman School until the age of 13, when she began studying at home. She currently lives in Miami.

Personal life 
On February 8, 2020, she married her boyfriend of five years, the Colombian singer Camilo Echeverry. In October 2021, the couple announced that Montaner was pregnant with their first child. On April 6, 2022, their daughter, Índigo, was born.

Career

2011-12: Grachi
Evaluna got her first role as a supporting character in Nickelodeon's Latin American series Grachi, playing Melanie Esquivel, the protagonist's sister.

2012: La Gloria de Dios
In 2012, Evaluna's father Ricardo Montaner chose to sing the Christian ballad La Gloria de Dios (The Glory of God), in addition to taking her on the tours of Frequent Flyer Tour, which began her career as a singer.

The song was presented for the first time in Argentina, during the tribute program to Ricardo Montaner in Gracias por venir, gracias por estar.

2013: Si existe
Si existe (If it exists) was the name of her first single released in December 2013, made with the help of her mother, the Venezuelan Marlene Rodriguez.

She was the host of the Día a Día program in the segment of La Voz Colombia.

2014-2021: Hot Pursuit, Yo me salvé, and other singles
In 2014, she played a supporting role in the movie Hot Pursuit as Teresa Cortez, a teenage girl who has her 15 year old party, shared the screen with stars Reese Witherspoon and Sofia Vergara.

In July 2014 Evaluna participated in the Christian festival held in Argentina called Jesús Fest where she presented her single, "Yo me salvé" (I Saved Myself), which would be released at the end of 2014 with its English version titled "Wings" and its respective videos.

In 2015 Evaluna performed again at Jesús Fest in Tecnopolis, Argentina, where she sang her songs and made some covers of Christian songs.

In 2018 and after a break of four years without singing, she presented her new singles "Por tu amor" and "Me liberé".

In February 2021, she released another single called "Uno Más Uno".

2019-2021: Club 57
In May 2019, she starred in Club 57, a co-production between Nickelodeon and Rainbow S.r.l. that was filmed in Miami and Italy. Her character, Eva, is a lover of science and mathematics who becomes trapped in 1957 with her brother Rubén (Sebastian Silva). In the series, she performed songs in Spanish, Italian and Portuguese.

Filmography

Movies

Television

Discography

Videography

References

External links
 

Living people
Spanish-language YouTubers
Venezuelan YouTubers
Venezuelan actresses
21st-century Venezuelan women singers
Singers from Caracas
Music YouTubers
Actresses from Caracas
1997 births
YouTube channels launched in 2014
Women in Latin music
Sony Music Latin artists
Venezuelan people of Argentine descent
Venezuelan emigrants to the United States
Venezuelan Christians
Performers of Christian music